Fotios Isaakidis (born 29 May 1908, date of death unknown) was a Greek sports shooter. He competed in the trap event at the 1964 Summer Olympics.

References

1908 births
Year of death missing
Greek male sport shooters
Olympic shooters of Greece
Shooters at the 1964 Summer Olympics
Place of birth missing
20th-century Greek people